Aziz Hitou (born 1 February 1990) is a Belgian futsal player who plays for Futsal Topsport Antwerpen and the Belgian national futsal team.

References

External links
UEFA profile

1990 births
Living people
Belgian men's futsal players